Dakshin Jhapardaha is a census town in Domjur CD Block of Howrah Sadar subdivision in Howrah district in the state of West Bengal, India. It is close to Domjur and also a part of Kolkata Urban Agglomeration.

Geography
Dakshin Jhapardaha is located at

Demographics
As per 2011 Census of India Dakshin Jhapardaha had a total population of 13,704 of which 6,892 (50%) were males and 6,812 (50%) were females. Population below 6 years was 1,306. The total number of literates in Dakshin Jhapardaha was 10,546 (85.06% of the population over 6 years).

Dakshin Jhapardaha was part of Kolkata Urban Agglomeration in 2011 census.

 India census, Dakshin Jhapardaha had a population of 11,439. Males constitute 50% of the population and females 50%. Dakshin Jhapardaha has an average literacy rate of 73%, higher than the national average of 59.5%: male literacy is 77% and female literacy is 69%. In Dakshin Jhapardaha, 10% of the population is under 6 years of age.

Transport
Amta Road (part of State Highway 15) is the artery of the town.

Bus

Private Bus
 63 Domjur - Howrah Station
 E44 Rampur - Howrah Station
 K11 Domjur - Rabindra Sadan

Mini Bus
 16 Domjur - Howrah Station
 34 Purash - Howrah Station
 35 Hantal - Howrah Station

CTC Bus
 C11 Domjur - B.B.D. Bagh/Belgachia
 C11/1 Munsirhat - Howrah Station

Bus Routes Without Numbers
 Bargachia - Sealdah Station (Barafkal)
 Pancharul - Howrah Station
 Udaynarayanpur - Howrah Station
 Rajbalhat - Howrah Station
 Tarakeswar - Howrah Station

Train
Domjur Road railway station on Howrah-Amta line is the nearest railway station.

References

Cities and towns in Howrah district
Neighbourhoods in Kolkata
Kolkata Metropolitan Area